Chris Kongo (born 23 December 1992) is a British professional boxer.

Boxing career
On 22 August 2020 Kongo won his first professional title with a ninth round TKO victory over Luther Clay to win the WBO Global Welterweight Title. Kongo later lost the title on 28 March 2021 to Michael McKinson by Unanimous Decision. On 11 July 2022 Kongo defeated Sebastian Formella by Unanimous Decision to win the vacant WBC International Silver Welterweight title.

Professional boxing record

References

1992 births
English male boxers
Living people